The Detroit City Council is the legislative body of Detroit, Michigan, United States.  The full-time council is required to meet every business day for at least 10 months of the year, with at least eight of these meetings occurring at a location besides city hall. The Detroit City Council has elected Mary Sheffield to be its next president.  The council may convene for special meetings at the call of the mayor or at least four members of council.

History
The City Council was first constituted as the legislative body of the city in 1824. The city began to grow more rapidly in the late 19th century, absorbing immigrants from Europe and migrants from the rural South and other areas. This body was called the Common Council until July 1, 1974.

Until the early 20th century, the council was elected from city wards, or single-member districts.  However, starting in 1918, at a time of changes in local government thought to be Progressive, the city council voted to require all city council members elected at-large. This reduced representation by geography from wards, where various ethnic groups tended to concentrate. It was considered unusual for a city of Detroit's size, which had competing political parties.

While voters in the city have become predominantly affiliated with the Democratic Party, they wanted more representation by district. On November 4, 2009, city voters overwhelmingly approved a referendum to once again elect seven of the nine council seats from single-member districts, and two at-large seats, beginning in 2013.

Composition & Election
The council is composed of nine members, seven of whom are elected from single-member districts using first-past-the-post voting, with two additional members elected at-large using block voting.  The council includes two officers, the president and president pro tempore, who are elected from among the members of the council at the beginning of each new session of the body for four-year terms.  The officers can be removed by a unanimous vote of council, exclusive of the member being removed, during any session meeting.  Elections to the body are officially non-partisan.

City Council Electoral Districts
A major overhaul of Detroit City Charter took place in 2012. This change moved to election by district for 7 districts and 2 at-large positions.

Current members

Committees
The council has six standing committees:

Budget, Finance & Audit
Neighborhood & Community Services
Internal Operations
Public Health & Safety
Planning and Economic Development
Rules

The council is granted the power to form additional committees at its own discretion

Vacancies and special elections
If a vacancy occurs on the city council, it is filled by appointment of the city council based on a two-thirds vote of its existing members.  The appointee serves until an elected member takes office, which is filled at the next general election scheduled in the city not held sooner than 180 days after the vacancy occurs, be that an election to fill federal, state, county or city offices.

Former members
Starting in 1919, nine Detroit City Council members were elected at large.  Members of the council, from 1919 to the present, are:

 Color coding: pink = Republican; blue = Democratic; light green = Farmer-Labor; dark green = Progressive; gray = unaffiliated.

Salaries
Salaries for elected officials are recommended every odd-numbered year by the Detroit Elected Officials Compensation Commission.  The 7-member board is appointed by the mayor and approved by the council, each member serving a 7-year term.

After being recommended by the compensation commission, City Council approved a pay increase of 3% on November 19, 2019. Regular City Council members will be paid $82,749 annually, while the City Council President will be paid $94,000.  Recommendations for salaries were recommended and approved in 2015 and 2017.  Prior to 2015 increases had not happened since 2001.

See also

Government of Detroit, Michigan
List of mayors of Detroit, Michigan

References

External links
Detroit City Council website

City councils in the United States
Government of Detroit
Government agencies established in 1824
1824 establishments in Michigan Territory